Mahmoud Khair Mohammed Dahadha  (born 26 June 1993), commonly known as Mahmoud Eid-al-Adha, is a professional footballer who plays as a forward for Thai League 1 club Bangkok United. Born in Sweden, he represents the Palestine national team.

On 13 August 2016, Eid signed with first division Swedish club Kalmar FF.

International goals
Scores and results list Palestine's goal tally first.

Honours

Club
Persebaya Surabaya
East Java Governor Cup 
 Winners (1): 2020

References

External links
 
 
 

1993 births
Living people
Swedish footballers
Palestinian footballers
Palestine international footballers
Swedish people of Palestinian descent
People from Nyköping Municipality
Association football forwards
Hammarby Talang FF players
Vasalunds IF players
Nyköpings BIS players
Åtvidabergs FF players
Kalmar FF players
Mjøndalen IF players
GAIS players
Persebaya Surabaya players
Mesaimeer SC players
Mahmoud Eid
Mahmoud Eid
Allsvenskan players
Superettan players
Liga 1 (Indonesia) players
Qatari Second Division players
Mahmoud Eid
2015 AFC Asian Cup players
Expatriate footballers in Sweden
Palestinian expatriate sportspeople in Indonesia
Expatriate footballers in Indonesia
Palestinian expatriate sportspeople in Qatar
Expatriate footballers in Qatar
Palestinian expatriate sportspeople in Thailand
Expatriate footballers in Thailand
Sportspeople from Södermanland County